Faat Zakirov (Russian: Фаат Закиров) (born 3 January 1974 in Andijan) is a former Russian cyclist.

Palmares
2000
2nd Overall Tour of Bulgaria
2001
1st Overall Tour of Slovenia
1st Stages 3 & 6
2002
3rd Giro dell'Appennino

References

1974 births
Living people
Russian male cyclists
People from Andijan